Pershino is a rural locality (a settlement) and the administrative center of Pershinskoye Rural Settlement, Kirzhachsky District, Vladimir Oblast, Russia. The population was 1,497 as of 2010. There are 14 streets.

Geography 
Pershino is located on the Sherna River, 11 km southwest of Kirzhach (the district's administrative centre) by road. Gribanovo is the nearest rural locality.

References 

Rural localities in Kirzhachsky District